History Salon is a student association and bulletin board system which was created on March 9, 2013, by students in China. History Salon is inspired by the knowledge seminars among Beijing in the 1980s. The name of the association comes from the "Democracy Salon" that organized in Peking University. Its discussions focused on the society and war issues of modern and contemporary Chinese history.

See also
YTHT

References
 History Salon Homepage 
 History Salon BBS Homepage 

Bulletin board systems
Internet in China
Student organizations established in 2013